Off to the Revolution by a 2CV is a 2001 Italian comedy film directed by Maurizio Sciarra. It won the Golden Leopard at the 2001 Locarno International Film Festival.

Cast 

Adriano Giannini: Marco
Gwenaëlle Simon: Claire
Andoni Garcia: Victor
Francisco Rabal: Uncle Henrique
Georges Moustaki: the poet 
Oscar Ladoire: Count Agaruez

References

External links

2001 films
Italian comedy films
Films set in 1974
Golden Leopard winners
2001 comedy films